John H. Davison (31 May 1930 – 5 March 1999) was an American composer and pianist.

Life and career
Born in Istanbul, Turkey, he grew up in Upstate New York and in New York City, and studied music at the Juilliard School's lower school, Haverford College, then received his master's degree from Harvard University, where he focused on Renaissance music, particularly the works of Orlando Gibbons. He earned his doctorate in creative composition from the Eastman School of Music. His teachers included Alfred Swan, Randall Thompson, Walter Piston, Bernard Rogers, Howard Hanson, Alan Hovhaness, and Robert Palmer. During 1964-1965, Davison was placed in the Kansas City (Missouri) Schools as part of the Music Educators National Conference's Contemporary Music Project, where he composed numerous works for band, chorus, and orchestra. He was a friend of Aaron Copland and maintained a correspondence with him. He was also a conscientious objector.

Davison's music is generally tonal, strongly melodic, and influenced by such diverse musics as Western classical and Romantic music (particularly the music of Johannes Brahms, Renaissance and Baroque music, Irish music, English country dancing, Anglican church music, and jazz.

His music is published by Southern Music Publishing Co., Shawnee Press, and TAP Music Publishing, and his music has been recorded by the CRI, Crystal, Coronet, Encore, and Albany labels.  He coauthored, with John Ashmead, a book about the songs of Robert Burns.

Davison taught at Haverford College from 1959 until his death. He was survived by his wife, Elizabeth Davison.

Works
1957 - Sonata for Trombone and Piano
1963 - Concerto for Harpsichord and Strings
1967 - Canzona and Chorale, 4 flutes
1967 - Suite, 8 brass instruments (2 horns, 2 trumpets, 3 trombones, and tuba)
1967 - Symphony no. 2 for Band
1968 - Suite, flute, violin, and piano
1968-69 - Sextet, English horn, violin, viola, violoncello, bass viola da gamba, and piano
1971 - Prelude and Rhapsody for Euphonium
1977 - Concertino for oboe and chamber orchestra
1980 - Sonata, euphonium (or trombone), tuba, and piano, Opus 73
1980 - Symphony no. 5
1983 - Arthur's Return, bagpipes and string orchestra
1985 - Sinfonia, cimbalon and chamber orchestra
1986 - Quintet, for trombone and string quartet
1986 - Suite for Six Trombones
1991 - Canzona & Reel/Jig, 4 flutes
1993 - Over the Mountain, Op. 115, orchestra
1994 - Cello Concerto, Op. 120
1996 - Sonata for Horn and Piano

Discography
1996 - Music of John Davison. Albany Records.

References

External links
John Davison page, from Haverford College site

1930 births
1999 deaths
American classical pianists
American male classical pianists
American male classical composers
American classical composers
20th-century classical composers
Haverford College faculty
Harvard University alumni
American conscientious objectors
Haverford College alumni
Eastman School of Music alumni
Musicians from New York City
Pupils of Walter Piston
Pupils of Bernard Rogers
Pupils of Randall Thompson
Pupils of Howard Hanson
20th-century classical pianists
20th-century American pianists
20th-century American composers
20th-century American male musicians
Albany Records artists